Karen Mayne is an American politician who served as a member of the Utah Senate from the 5th District. She assumed office on January 2, 2008, succeeding her husband, Ed Mayne.
She won re-election for the 12th senate district after redistricting. On January 4, 2023 Karen Mayne announced her plan to resign office due to unexpected changes in her health. The Utah Democratic Party held a special election on January 15, 2023, in which at the time Representative Karen Kwan was elected to fill her seat.

Early life and education
Mayne was born in Salt Lake City. She is a graduate of Chamber West Leadership Center and attended Henagers Business College.

Career
Mayne worked as a para-educator for 20 years in the Granite School District. Throughout her career in education, she won the Para-educator of the Year, the American Federation of Teachers, the Lucy Beth Rampton Award for Community Service, and the Service to Community Award.

Before her position as senator, Mayne was active in her local PTA, baseball and football organizations, and numerous political and community activities.

Upon the death of her husband, Senator Ed Mayne, in 2007, Mayne was appointed to his senate seat. She was then elected in 2008 and 2010 as a Democrat. In 2014, she served as the Assistant Minority Whip, and beginning in 2015 she has served as the Senate Minority Whip.

During her service as senator, Mayne has won a number of awards, including the Elenor Roosevelt Distinguished Woman of the Year Award, Legislator of the Year Award From Salt Lake Community College, Utah School Nurse Association Appreciation Award, "Hero on the Hill," from the Legislative Coalition for People with Disabilities, Firefighters' Legislator of the Year, Workers Compensation Fund President's Award, the Sunshine Award (given for protection of free speech and open government), Salt Lake Chamber of Commerce's Business Champion of 2013, and the Award of Excellence in Workplace Safety and Health presented by the Rocky Mountain Center.

Personal life 
Mayne has two children and six grandchildren. She is a lifelong resident of the West side of Salt Lake Valley. She is a member of the Methodist Church.

In January 2022, Mayne was hospitalized after falling at her home and suffered from a head and shoulder injury. She was later diagnosed with cancer while receiving treatment for her injuries.

Election results
In 2014 Mayne was unopposed in the primary. During the general election she had a challenger who dropped out before the election and won unopposed.

2008

2010

Legislation

Notable legislation 
In 2014, Mayne sponsored S.B. 36, which only allows certain groups, such as political parties and health care providers, to access voter birth dates. It also restricts their use of that information for verifying identities or political purposes, such as urging support for a candidate. The Governor signed this bill into law.

In 2016 Mayne sponsored a bill which will create a feasibility study to determine how postal service workers can be utilized to aid with emergency response efforts. This bill was supported by Representative Jason Chaffetz as part of his effort to make the postal service more universal.

References

External links
Utah State Legislature – Senator Karen Mayne official government website
Project Vote Smart – Senator Karen Mayne (UT) profile
Follow the Money – Karen Mayne 2008 campaign contributions

21st-century American politicians
21st-century American women politicians
Methodists from Utah
Living people
Politicians from Salt Lake City
Democratic Party Utah state senators
Women state legislators in Utah
Year of birth missing (living people)
Spouses of Utah politicians